Lightburn is a district in the Scottish city of Glasgow. It is situated north of the River Clyde. It takes its name from the Light Burn which flows through the area, mostly in culvert.

Areas of Glasgow